Mount Pleasant is a community in the Canadian province of Nova Scotia, located in Cumberland County .

References
Mount Pleasant on Destination Nova Scotia

Communities in Cumberland County, Nova Scotia
General Service Areas in Nova Scotia